Georges Langevin (1 October 1888 – 22 August 1967) was a French fencer. He competed in the individual sabre event at the 1908 Summer Olympics.

References

External links
 

1888 births
1967 deaths
French male sabre fencers
Olympic fencers of France
Fencers at the 1908 Summer Olympics